Peakhurst High School also known as Georges River College Peakhurst Campus, is a Co-Ed middle school going from year 7 to 10. This school offers comprehensive education from years 7–10.

Students who complete Year 10 at GRC Peakhurst Campus have an automatic place in GRC Oatley Campus (11-12).

Facilities
Facilities include:
 D Block -  Maths & Computing. Consists of several maths classrooms and computer labs, as well as the school administration area on the lower level.
 A Block - Design & Technology. Contains kitchens and textile rooms. Also consists of a computer lab, photography dark room, science labs, classrooms for special ed students, child studies room & more.
 E Block - English & HSIE. Consists mainly of English rooms, History rooms and Geography classrooms, but also science labs.
 C Block - CAPA - Contains several Art rooms, Woodwork and Metalwork rooms, Music classrooms, and some computer labs.
 F Block -  Varied - F Block holds multipurpose classrooms. It contains a Japanese room, a dance room, PE rooms, a games room and a two science labs.

References

Public high schools in Sydney
1964 establishments in Australia
School buildings completed in 1964
Educational institutions established in 1964